Christos Michail (Greek: Χρήστος Μιχαήλ; born 28 February 1962) is a former football goalkeeper and currently goalkeeping coach.

Career
He started his career from Panserraikos. In 1980, he went to AEL, where he played until 1994. During his presence in Larissa he won one Greek Championship and one Greek Cup. In 1994, he moved to Ionikos, where he played for one year and next season returned to AEL. One year later he went to Apollon Larisas, where he ended his career. He was in the Greece national team for one game, Greece against Netherlands for Euro 1988 qualification round.

Honours
Larissa
Greek League: 1 (1988)
Greek Cup: 1 (1985)

References

External links 

Ionikos F.C. players
Athlitiki Enosi Larissa F.C. players
Greece international footballers
Greek footballers
Living people
1962 births
Footballers from Serres
Association football goalkeepers